In the United Kingdom, prisoners are divided into four categories of security. Each adult is assigned a category, depending on the crime committed, the sentence, the risk of escape, and violent tendencies. The categories are single letters, in alphabetical order, with 'A' as the most secure, and 'D' the least.

There are three different prison services in the United Kingdom, and separate services for the three Crown Dependencies. His Majesty's Prison Service manages prisons in England and Wales, and also serves as the National Offender Management Service for England and Wales. Prisons in Scotland are managed by the Scottish Prison Service and prisons in Northern Ireland are managed by the Northern Ireland Prison Service. The Isle of Man and the Channel Islands have their own prison administrations.

Prisoner categories in England and Wales
Prisons in England and Wales are divided into several categories relating to the age, gender and security classification of the prisoners it holds.

Male adult prisoners

Male adult prisoners (those aged 18 or over) are given a security categorisation soon after they enter prison. These categories are based on a combination of the type of crime committed, the length of sentence, the likelihood of escape, and the danger to the public if they were to escape. The four categories are:

Category A, B and C prisons are called closed prisons, whereas category D prisons are called open prisons.

Category A prisoners are further divided into Standard Risk, High Risk, and Exceptional Risk, based on their likelihood of escaping.

Men on remand are held in Category B conditions with the exception of some of those who are held to be tried on (very) serious offences. These men are held in "Provisional Category A" conditions.

Escape List prisoners
Prisoners who have made active attempts to escape from custody are placed on the holding prison's Escape List. These prisoners (sometimes referred to as "E men" or "E List men") are required to wear distinctive, brightly coloured clothing when being moved both inside and outside of the prison and are handcuffed. In addition they are required to change cells frequently and to have their clothes and some of their personal property removed from their cell before being locked in for the night.

Female adult prisoners
Women are also classified into four categories. These categories are:

 Restricted Status is similar to Category A for men.
 Closed is for women who do not require Restricted Status, but for whom escape needs to be very difficult.
 Semi-open was introduced in 2001 and is for those who are unlikely to try to escape, but cannot be trusted in an open prison. This has been phased out. HMP Morton Hall and HMP Drake Hall were re-designated as closed in March 2009.
 Open is for those who can be safely trusted to stay within the prison.

Remand prisoners are always held in closed prisons.

Children
When children under 18 are sentenced or remanded in custody, they may be sent to one of three types of establishment depending on their needs, age, vulnerability and the nature of the offence they have been accused or convicted of:

 Young Offender Institutions (YOIs) which are prison based establishments very similar to adult prisons that hold those convicted and remanded for offences but that only hold males aged 15–20 (ages 15–17 and ages 18–20 are housed separately) and who are not classed as vulnerable.
 Secure Training Centres (STCs) which are secure custody establishments but that focus more on things such as education, welfare, health and support rather than traditional prison style punishment. They hold convicted males aged 12–14 and females aged 12–17 in separate accommodation. Though males aged 15–17 can be held also if they are classed as vulnerable.
 Secure Children's Homes (SCHs) which are similar to STC's in that they mainly focus on things like education, welfare, health and support rather than traditional prison style punishment. They hold very young males and females aged 10–11 convicted or remanded usually for only serious offences. Though males and females aged 12–14 can be held also if they are classed as vulnerable. Additionally males and females all the way up to the age of 17 can be held if they are refused bail and remanded (but not yet convicted) to be held by local children's authorities (and not the prison service) usually if they are more vulnerable, at risk or a YOI is not suitable. It should also be noted that not all children held in SCHs have necessarily been convicted, remanded or accused of crimes, some are held by court orders on safety grounds under legislation such as the Children Act 1989 due to things like their history of absconding from regular open children's care homes, risk of committing harm to themselves or others, or those at high risk of vulnerability from things such as forms of abuse, illicit drugs use and child prostitution.

Prisoner categories in Scotland

Since 2002, in Scotland, prisoners have been assigned to one of three categories:

 High Supervision: an individual for whom all activities and movements require to be authorised, supervised and monitored by prison staff.
 Medium Supervision: an individual for whom activities and movements are subject to locally specified limited supervision and restrictions.
 Low Supervision: an individual for whom activities and movements, specified locally, are subject to minimum supervision and restrictions.  Low Supervision prisoners may be entitled to release on temporary licence and unsupervised activities in the community.

Prisoner categories in Northern Ireland

Prisoners (adult and young, male and female) are classified in a similar way to the English/Welsh system:

See also
 His Majesty's Prison Service
 Howard League for Penal Reform
 List of prisons in the United Kingdom
 Scottish Prison Service

References

External links
 HM Prison Service
 Young Offenders Institutions
 Howard League for Penal Reform

 
 
 
 
 
 
 
Penal system in the United Kingdom